The Bhimeswar Dwadas Jyotirlinga Dham, one of the Jyotirlingas, is located at Dakini hill (also known as Daini pahar) near Pamohi in Guwahati. It is situated at the hill just besides the Deepor Beel. It is believed that Lord Shiva had incarnated here to destroy a demon called Bhimasura and protect his devotees.

The exact location of Dakini is a debated subject. The Shiva Purana and the Koti Rudra Samhita refer to Bhimashankar Jyotirlinga on Dakini hill. Bhimeswar dham at Pamohi is interpreted by the devotees to be the same Dwadas Jyotirlinga. Bhimashankar dham of Pune is also referred by some people as the Dwadas Jyotirlinga.

There is no temple here. Instead there is a hill stream surrounding the Shiva Linga and one can observe continuous water flowing over the Linga. There is also a Lord Ganesha temple on the half way to this dham. The road leading to the linga is very beautiful with hills, streams and bamboo grooves.

Legend
According to Shiva Purana, Kumbhakarna (brother of Lanka king Ravana) was in love with Karkati, daughter of King of Patal Lok. When Ravana came to invite Karkati’s father and Kumbhakarna to fight with Rama, Kumbhakarna refused to come until Ravana allowed him to marry Karkati. At last on the advice of Narada, Ravana agreed and Kumbhakarna married Karkati. After marriage Kumbhakarna left Karkati to participate in the war. After Kumbhakarna’s death, Karkati gave birth to Kumbhakarna’s son; who was named as Bhimasura. Bhimasura did penance to get boon from Lord Brahma of unreal strength and to be not killed by Lord Vishnu by any means. He later challenged Lord Vishnu to fight with him. Lord Vishnu agreed and deliberately lost the war to keep Lord Brahma’s boon. This made Bhimasura very arrogant and he started conquering various kingdoms. He imprisoned the king Priyadharman (also called Kamrupeshwar) and his wife Dakshinadevi of Kamrupa.

King Priyadharman and his wife were worshiping Lord Shiva even in prison. When Bhimasura sent his army to stop King worshiping, they were destroyed by rage of Lord Shiva. Bhimasura wanted to kill king Kamrupeshwar. When Bhimasura attacked the king busy in worship at this place, his sword fell on the Linga instead of the king. Instantly Lord Shiva appeared and killed Bhimasura. The sweat from his body formed a river, said to be the same steam which is running over the Jyotirlinga now. The place where king was worshiping Lord Shiva was named after this episode as Bhimeswar. On the request of the gods, sages and devotees, Lord Shiva agreed to reside there eternally by the name of Bhimashankar.

Access
It is around 13 km from Guwahati. One has to go to Pamohi from NH 37 in Guwahati to reach Bhimeswar. The area is accessible by trekkers and magic cars from Gorchuk. Also Uber and Ola services take you to the main gate of the temple. Guwahati is well connected with other parts of the country by road, rail and air. Members of the Brahmon Sobha, a registered global society, perform "Rudra Yagna" & "Rudravishek Paath" on the occasion of MahaShivratri. The Assam State Transport Corporation ply buses to carry devotees to the Shrine from Gorchuk at regular intervals.

References

Jyotirlingas
Hindu temples in Guwahati
Tourist attractions in Guwahati